Peep Show is a British television sitcom starring David Mitchell and Robert Webb. It was broadcast on Channel 4 in the United Kingdom. Written by Jesse Armstrong and Sam Bain, the series explores the lives of Mark Corrigan (Mitchell) and Jeremy "Jez" Usbourne (Webb). It is filmed almost entirely from the physical points-of-view of the characters, and viewers can hear the interior monologues of Mark and Jez.

At the beginning of the series, Mark is attracted to his colleague Sophie (Olivia Colman), and Jez tries to break through into the music business. As the series progresses, it becomes clear that Jez is unlikely to be successful. Jez falls in love with Nancy (Rachel Blanchard), an American Christian, and they marry to get her a visa. She leaves him and Jez later has relationships with Michelle and Elena, followed by flings with Zahra, Joe and Megan. Mark begins to question his love for Sophie. They also marry, though Mark does not want to, and Sophie leaves him right after the wedding ceremony. Months later, they have sex once; the condom breaks and Sophie discovers she is pregnant. Sophie does not know if he, Jez or Jeff is the father. A DNA test reveals Mark to be the father, and the estranged couple have a son named Ian James. Soon after separating from Sophie, Mark begins a long-term relationship with his JLB Credit colleague Dobby.

The first series began on 19 September 2003, and the ninth and last series started on 11 November 2015. The first series was directed by Jeremy Wooding, the second and third by Tristram Shapeero and the fourth to ninth by Becky Martin. Channel 4 was planning to cancel the show after the third series because of poor viewing figures. However, high sales of DVDs encouraged Channel 4 to allow the series to continue, with the fifth series commissioned before the fourth was broadcast. A sixth series was commissioned during the fifth series, and the seventh series before the sixth was broadcast.

Peep Show won the Rose d'Or for "Best European Sitcom" in 2004, "Best TV Comedy" at the British Comedy Awards in 2006 and 2007, "Best Television Comedy Actor" for Mitchell in the 2007 British Comedy Awards, "Best Returning British Sitcom of 2007" by the British Sitcom Guide (now the British Comedy Guide), the "Comedy performance" award for both Mitchell and Webb in the 2007 Royal Television Society awards, "Comedy of the Year 2008" by the British Comedy Guide, writers Bain and Armstrong won the "Writer – Comedy" award in the 2009 Royal Television Society awards, and Mitchell winning the BAFTA Television Award 2009 for "Best Comedy Performance".

Series overview

Episodes

Series 1 (2003)

Series 2 (2004)

Series 3 (2005)

Series 4 (2007)

Series 5 (2008)

Series 6 (2009)

Series 7 (2010)

Series 8 (2012)

Series 9 (2015)

References

Channel 4-related lists
Lists of black comedy television series episodes
Lists of British LGBT-related television series episodes
Lists of British sitcom episodes
Lists of sex comedy television series episodes